Paracymoriza rivularis is a moth in the family Crambidae. It was described by Frederic Moore in 1888. It is found in Darjeeling, India.

References

Acentropinae
Moths described in 1888